Jean Reverzy (Balan, April 10, 1914–Lyon, July 9, 1959) is a French medical doctor from Lyon who won the Prix Renaudot in 1954 for Le Passage ("The Passage"), his first novel.  It described the slow anguish of a patient with liver problems who returned with a tired woman of Polynesia.  It is a description of the passage from life to death, in a raw and realistic manner, including poetic nostalgia.

Another work, Place des angoisses ("Agony Square"), describes through the eyes of a young doctor the ominous, oppressive atmosphere of Lyon's Bellecour - the city's medical quarter.

External links
  Reverzy

1914 births
1959 deaths
French physicians
Prix Renaudot winners
French novelists